Krok Fjord is a narrow sinuous fjord,  long, between Mule Peninsula and Sorsdal Glacier Tongue, at the south end of the Vestfold Hills, Antarctica. It was mapped from air photos taken by the Lars Christensen Expedition (1936–37) and named "Krokfjorden" (the crooked fjord).

References

Fjords of Princess Elizabeth Land
Ingrid Christensen Coast